Antimony tribromide (SbBr3) is a chemical compound containing antimony in its +3 oxidation state.

Production
It may be made by the reaction of antimony with elemental bromine, or by the reaction of antimony trioxide with hydrobromic acid. 

Alternatively, it can be prepared by the action of bromine on a mixture of antimony sulfide and antimony trioxide at 250 °C.

Uses
It can be added to polymers such as polyethylene as a fire retardant. It is also used in the production of other antimony compounds, in chemical analysis, as a mordant, and in dyeing.

Chemical properties
Antimony tribromide has two crystalline forms, both having orthorhombic symmetries. When a warm carbon disulfide solution of SbBr3 is rapidly cooled, it crystallizes into the needle-like α-SbBr3, which then slowly converts to the more stable β form.

Antimony tribromide hydrolyzes in water to form hydrobromic acid and antimony trioxide:

 2 SbBr3 + 3 H2O → Sb2O3 + 6 HBr

References

Bromides
Metal halides
Antimony(III) compounds